Erik Kusnyír (born 7 February 2000) is a professional footballer who plays for NB I club Debreceni VSC. Born in Ukraine, he has represented Hungary at youth level.

Club career

Debrecen
On 5 May 2018, Kusnyír played his first match for Debrecen in a 3-1 win against Budapest Honvéd in the Hungarian League.

International career
In May 2019, he was called for the first time to the Ukraine national team for training camp by manager Andriy Shevchenko.

Career statistics

Club

References

External links

2000 births
Living people
People from Zakarpattia Oblast
Ukrainian people of Hungarian descent
Hungarian footballers
Hungary youth international footballers
Association football midfielders
Debreceni VSC players
Nemzeti Bajnokság I players
Hungarian people of Ukrainian descent